|}

The Patton Stakes is a Listed flat horse race in Ireland open to thoroughbreds aged three years old. It is run at Dundalk over a distance of 1 mile (1,609 metres), and it is scheduled to take place each year in late February or early March.

The race was first run in 2013, replacing in the calendar an equivalent race at The Curragh known as the Loughbrown Stakes. Until 2017 the Patton Stakes was run in April over a distance of 7 furlongs. In 2018 it was moved to a March date and increased to 1 mile to become part of the European series of the Road to the Kentucky Derby.

Records
Leading jockey (2 wins):
 Colin Keane. – Convergence (2015), Juncture (2022)
 Seamie Heffernan – Washington DC (2016), War Secretary (2017)
 Shane Crosse -  Crossfirehurricane (2020), My Generation (2021) 
 Ryan Moore - Mendelssohn (2018), Cairo (2023)

Leading trainer (5 wins):
 Aidan O'Brien – Gale Force Ten (2013), Washington DC (2016), War Secretary (2017), Mendelssohn (2018), Cairo (2023)

Winners

Loughbrown Stakes winners

See also 
Horse racing in Ireland
List of Irish flat horse races

References
Racing Post:

Flat races in Ireland
Flat horse races for three-year-olds
Recurring sporting events established in 2013
Dundalk Stadium
2013 establishments in Ireland